Pignet Index or Body Build Index is an index used for evaluation of body build. It was suggested in 1901 by Maurice–Charles–Joseph Pignet, who was a French army doctor.

Pignet Index is expressed by formula:

 Stature in cm - (weight in kg + chest circumference in cm)

Body build according to this index is noted as:
Very sturdy: <10
Sturdy: 10-15
Good: 16-20
Average: 21-25
Weak: 26-30
Very weak: 31-35
Poor: >36

References

Classification of obesity
Anthropometry
Biological anthropology